Hubert Taczanowski (born 1 October 1960, Poland) is a US and UK-based motion picture cinematographer.

He is the son of Stanisław and Mirosława (née Sadżak) Taczanowski and a member of the former magnate family Taczanowski from Poznań  A graduate of Cinematography at the famed Łódź Film School in Poland, Taczanowski has been the director of photography on nineteen feature films and two television series. His films have been screened at the Sundance, Venice, Toronto, Edinburgh and Berlin Film Festivals. Additionally, he has shot over twenty music videos for Sony Music, Atlantic Records, EMI and Chrysalis. In January 2007 he married British costume designer Stephanie Collie. He resides in New York and London.

Filmography

Cinematographer 
 Love, Wedding, Repeat (2020)
 How to Build a Girl (2019)
 Military Wives (2019)
 London Town (2016)
 Spooks: The Greater Good (2015)
 The Face of an Angel (2014)
 The Look of Love (2013)
 National Lampoon's Bag Boy (2007)
 D-War (2007)
 Van Wilder 2: The Rise of Taj (2006)
 Wild Things: Diamonds in the Rough  Wild Things 3 (2005)
 Hotel Infinity (2004)
 Deathwatch (2002)
 My Little Eye (2002)
 Tadpole (2002)
 Home Movie (2001)
 How to Kill Your Neighbor's Dog (2000)
 Turn It Up (2000)
 Buddy Boy (1999)
 Break Up (1998)
 The Opposite of Sex (1998)
 Chicago Cab a.k.a. Hellcab (1997)
 The Maker (1997)
 Eden (1996)
 Last Exit to Earth (1996)
 The Young Poisoner's Handbook a.k.a. Das Handbuch des jungen Giftmischers (1995)

External links
 

20th-century Polish nobility
Polish cinematographers
Living people
1960 births
Hubert